Alma-Atinskaya:

 Alma-Atinskaya (Moscow Metro)
 Alma-Atinskaya declaration; see Alma-Ata Protocol